Eric Henry Halstead  (26 May 1912 – 18 June 1991) was a New Zealand politician of the National Party and later a diplomat.

Biography

Early life and career
Halstead was born in Auckland in 1912, and educated at Auckland Grammar School and Auckland University where he attained a Master of Arts and a Bachelor of Commerce. He was president of the Auckland University Students' Association for one year. In 1940, he married Millicent Joan Stewart; they had four children. While a student he had his first involvement in politics after being invited to hear National Party MP Gordon Coates speak in 1938.

He served as a major in the NZEF during World War II between 1941 and 1945.

After being demobilized he became a teacher and was head of the commerce and accountancy department at Seddon Technical College from 1945 to 1949.

Political career

He was a liberal within the National Party and, alongside  MP Dean Eyre, he supported the alternative drainage scheme in Auckland proposed by Dove-Myer Robinson.

He was the minister assisting the Prime Minister in 1954, a role in which Halstead often found his time occupied by simply delivering messages between the Prime Minister Sidney Holland and the Deputy Prime Minister Keith Holyoake. He held several cabinet posts during the last term of the First National Government including; Minister for Social Security from 1954 to 1956,Minister of Industries and Commerce and Minister for Customs from  1956 to 1957. As a minister he worked out a welfare reciprocity deal with the United Kingdom and he established the Tourist Hotel Corporation.

After his defeat in 1957 Halstead became a director of Air New Zealand. Halstead remained an active member of the National Party well after his defeat, despite not wishing to re-enter parliament by standing in Tamaki again. He was a longtime member of the party's Dominion Council, deputy-chairman of National's Auckland division and vice-president of the party.

Diplomatic career
He later served as Ambassador to Thailand and Laos 1970–1973, then Ambassador to Italy and Ambassador to Iraq concurrently from 1976–1980 and Ambassador to Saudi Arabia (while resident in Rome) 1977–1980.

Later life and death
In the 1980 New Year Honours, Halstead was appointed a Commander of the Order of the British Empire.

After returning from World War II he developed an interest in war history. In 1989, a book put together by Halstead, entitled Freyberg's Men, was refused permission to be published by the New Zealand Government because it bore too close a resemblance to copyright material originally published by the New Zealand Army Board and War History Branch, Department of Internal Affairs.

He died in Auckland in 1991.

Notes

References

1912 births
1991 deaths
People educated at Auckland Grammar School
University of Auckland alumni
New Zealand National Party MPs
New Zealand military personnel of World War II
Members of the Cabinet of New Zealand
People from Auckland
Ambassadors of New Zealand to Thailand
Ambassadors of New Zealand to Italy
Ambassadors of New Zealand to Iraq
Ambassadors of New Zealand to Saudi Arabia
Members of the New Zealand House of Representatives
New Zealand MPs for Auckland electorates
Unsuccessful candidates in the 1957 New Zealand general election
New Zealand Commanders of the Order of the British Empire